Christopher Steven Brown (also known as CB and Chris Brown; born May 16, 1984, Flint, Michigan) is an American music executive.

Early life and education 
Chris was born in Flint, Michigan and started to work in the mortgage industry at the age of 19. In 2009, he left the industry when the market crashed due to the Subprime mortgage crisis. Brown then changed career and graduated from the Connecticut School of Broadcasting in 2014.

Career 
After graduating from the Connecticut School of Broadcasting, Brown began his career as a former executive of Citadel Communications. In 2014 and 2015 Brown was the co-host of the Home and Castle Television series.

Brown served as the Senior National Director of Pop at Sony Music.

Some of Brown's credits include multi-platinum awards.

In March 2020, Brown was nominated in the "Indy Record Executive" category of the WorldWide Radio Summit awards. The award was won by Daniel Glass from Glassnote Music.

References 

Living people
1984 births
American music industry executives
People from Flint, Michigan